Setlagole (Se tla a gola) is a historical Setswana village next to the N18 in Ngaka Modiri Molema District Municipality in the North West province of South Africa.

The inhabitants are Batswana Nation members, and during King Tau's reign, they adopted Tholo (khudu) as their totem. They call each other Mokgopa, Modiboa, Noto, and so on.

Barolong were well-known throughout Southern Africa for their iron-smelting abilities.

The House of Letsapa of Barolong BooRatlou Ba ga Seitshiro(ii)  is the reigning royal house in Setlagole and it has active royal families in Setlagole and in Kraaipan/Mahukubung.

The Letsapa royal house includes anyone related to the throne, such as blood siblings, blood uncles, aunts, and cousins. Every member of the different Letsapa royal families remains a member of the Barolong royal sucession line, regardless of whether their family sits on any Barolong sub thrones or not, and the Letsapa royal house is made up of all royal families descended from Kgosi moshweu's only legitimate house, which is with his first wife.

The Letsapa house remains the rightful heir apparent house in the succession line to the Barolong throne to this day. In a system governed by some form of primogeniture that favors male heirs and strict traditional succession laws applied during the time of Kgosi Tau, the same laws that determined Ratlou's seniority.  The first heir apparent to the throne Seitshiro(i) had a son named Kgosi~thebe (i)  who died without an issue leaving Moshoeu as the next apparent heir in line to the throne reigning in his own right, Mokoto was Seitshiro(i)'s third son. 

The Barolong royals left Taung under Ntinka, the younger brother of Tau. They settled in Dithakwaneng, and later Dithakong, where Ntinka died and was laid to rest. They set out from Dithakong for Mamusa, and then Setlagole.
Ratlou ascended to the throne in his youth. Seleka became his regent, and after Ratlou was formally installed as King, Seleka became the Barolong Prime Minister. Following Ratlou's death, there was a schism between the heir apparent Seitshiro(i) and the heir presumptive (Moriba).Moriba's eligibility in the line of succession was displaced because he was regarded as Tau's youngest son by the strict application of traditional succession law due to his mother's marriage to Tau shortly before Tau's death, despite being the son of Ratlou.
Ratlou was further divided into two sub-clans as a result of the fierce battle between Moriba and Seitshiro I
When Ratlou died and was laid to rest in Mosita. Modirwagale was appointed as Seitshiro’s regent while Moriba and Mokalaka broke away from the majority.
Seitshiro I had a son who died without issue and was succeeded by his second son, Moshoeu. 
Seitshiro(ii), the eldest of Moshoeu's four legitimate sons from his first and main wife, was the eldest of these.
The eligibility of Moshoeu's children in the line of succession from houses led by Sekgoro, Matlhaku, and others was displaced because their mother was already betrothed.
 
Following the death of Kgosi-thebe I Moshoeu assumed the throne in his own right as the next in line to the throne.

Rivalry arose among Moshoeu's children after his death. 
Seitshiro (ii), the heir apparent, and the other children led by Matlhaku.
Seitshiro(ii) relocated to Dithakong to avoid conflict. 

Matlhaku was appointed regent for his sibling Sekgoro, who was now the Barolong throne's pretender.
Matlhaku was appointed regent pretender once more for Segoro's son Kgosi (ii). 

The regency pretenderiship era began as a result of the pretender's inability to ascend to the throne because the throne was occupied through the primogeniture system.

Matlhaku was murdered along with his brother Nketsang and cousin Motlhabane, leaving Mongale as regent, who was later murdered in Thaba Nchu.

Mokoto, the grand uncle of the pretender heir named kgosi, became a regent and appointed himself Prime Minister. 
Kgosi named his eldest son Moshwete (after Robert Moffat) and died as a result of an attack by the Batlokwa of Manthatisi in Khunwana. 
Gontse (Mokoto's son) was appointed regent for the pretender ship.

Letsapa, who was now the legitimate first in line to the throne, succeeded his father Seitshiro(ii) in Dithakong before moving to Shudintlhe and eventually settling in Modimong near Taung.
Moshwete served under some Europeans in the Potchefstroom area, which is now known as Potchefstroom. 
Masisi (son of Matlhaku) inherited the regency pretendership from Matlhaku at Mocwi oa Petlwana at this point.
Following an attack by Paul Kruger and Andried Pretorius, the Letsapa relocated to the south of the area now known as Vryburg before returning to Shudintlhe, where they were joined by Gontse.
Masisi died in Modimong shortly after sending Gontse's son (Phoi) to a conference in Buurmansdrift between the Batswana Chiefs and a commission of the Transvaal Republic to reach an agreement on the issue of land boundaries.
Even when there was a legitimacy dispute between the Seitshiro(ii) and the Segoro descendants, Moshwete was installed as Barolong King by the colonial powers, and through this installation and colonial recognition, the colonial powers were able to legitimize tribal land annexation.

The Barolong royal court moved around the various Barolong territories without a fixed capital city, but the original Setlagole remained a central location throughout the different dynasties.

The remaining areas of the last Barolong head- quarters Setlagole is divided into sections which are Lokaleng,Tuka and Kgothu.

This sections cover the following areas
1. Lokaleng is the original section which houses native families of the village and it covers areas such as -(Weskamp, Shaleng, ,Letsapa,Thoteng,Lopapeng to Mosita and all other neighbouring farms.
2. Tuka - (Tuka to Thutlwane)
3. Kgothu - ( Mokoto, New stance to Setlhatlhwe)

Today the original Barolong territories covers a significant part of the country and scattered across different provinces.

History

Battle of Mosita 
From Setlagole the Barolong and Bahurutshe launched their own hit-and-run attacks into the Rustenburg and Schoonspruit as well as southern Marico districts.

Thereafter, Setlagole became a staging post for raids on Boer farms in the western Tranvaal.  A surviving Boer document records the loss of 287 cattle from eight Schoonspruit farms during one such foray."

Megabreccia outcrops 
"A 25 to 30 km wide magnetic anomaly within the >2.79 Ga granite-greenstone rocks of the northwestern Kaapvaal Craton is spatially associated with megabreccia outcrops near the village of Setlagole in the North West Province, South Africa. The breccia comprises angular to rounded ciasts of TTG gneisses, granites and granodiorites, with lesser amounts of amphibolite, calc-silicate rock and banded iron-formation as well as unusual dark grey to black, irregular, centimetre- to decimetre-sized ciasts that show evidence of fluidal behaviour and plastic deformation during incorporation into the breccia."

References

https://www.researchgate.net/publication/274325697_A_possible_mesoarchaean_impact_structure_at_Setlagole_North_West_Province_South_Africa_Aeromagnetic_and_field_evidence

Populated places in the Ratlou Local Municipality